Elections for the House of Representatives of the Philippines were held on May 8, 1995. Being the first midterm election since 1938, the party of the incumbent president, Fidel V. Ramos's Lakas-NUCD-UMDP, won a plurality of the seats in the House of Representatives.

The elected representatives served in the 10th Congress from 1995 to 1998. Jose de Venecia, Jr. was easily reelected as the speaker of the House.

Results
The administration party, Lakas-NUCD-UMDP, forged an electoral agreement with Laban ng Demokratikong Pilipino to create the Lakas-Laban Coalition. Candidates from the Liberal Party and PDP–Laban also joined the administration coalition. On the other hand, Nationalist People's Coalition led the opposition coalition that also composed of candidates from Kilusang Bagong Lipunan, People's Reform Party and Partido ng Masang Pilipino.

Per coalition
Definitions:
Administration coalition: Ran solely under the banner of one of the following: Lakas-NUCD-UMDP, Laban ng Demokratikong Pilipino, Liberal Party, and PDP–Laban
Opposition coalition: Ran solely under the banner of one of the following: Nationalist People's Coalition, Kilusang Bagong Lipunan, People's Reform Party, and Partido ng Masang Pilipino
Others: Ran solely on other parties and coalitions not mentioned above
Hybrid coalitions: Ran on any combinations of parties and coalitions mentioned above

Per party

See also
10th Congress of the Philippines

References

  

1995
1995 elections in the Philippines